AS-34 is a Russian , or rescue mini-submarine, which went into service in 1989.

Service record
In 2000, AS-34 was stationed aboard the rescue ship Rudnetsky and participated in operations to attempt a rescue of personnel from the sunken submarine Kursk. The submarine managed to reach Kursk but was unable to establish a seal to fully dock on the ninth compartment and effect rescue.

See also

References

Priz-class deep-submergence rescue vehicles
Kursk submarine disaster
1989 ships
Ships built in the Soviet Union
Submarines of the Soviet Navy